Sergei Aleksandrovich Rodin (24 January 1981 – 16 January 2021) was a Russian professional football player.

Club career
He made his debut in the Russian Premier League in 1999 for PFC CSKA Moscow.

Honours
 Russian Premier League bronze: 1999.

References

1981 births
2021 deaths
Russian footballers
Russia youth international footballers
Russia under-21 international footballers
Association football midfielders
PFC CSKA Moscow players
FC Kuban Krasnodar players
FC Kristall Smolensk players
FC Anzhi Makhachkala players
FC Sokol Saratov players
Russian Premier League players
FC Novokuznetsk players
FC Sportakademklub Moscow players